Chaudhry Armaghan Subhani (born 5 January 1966) is a Pakistani politician who has been a member of the National Assembly of Pakistan, since August 2018. Previously, he was a member of the National Assembly from June 2013 to May 2018 and a member of the Provincial Assembly of the Punjab from 1993 to 1996 and again from 2002 to 2007.His cousins Choudhary Khush Akhtar Subhani and Tariq Subhani also remained Member of the Provincial Assembly of the Punjab in the Past.

Early life and education
Chaudhary Armaghan Subhani was born on 5 January 1966 in a Landlord Gujjar family of Sialkot. His father Ch Abdul Sattar Vario was already a prominent and influential politician at that time. He is the oldest of 5 brothers.

He graduated in 1990 from the University of the Punjab and earned the degree of Bachelor of Arts.

Political career
He was elected to the Provincial Assembly of the Punjab from Constituency PP-108 (Sialkot) as a candidate of Pakistan Muslim League (J) in 1993 Pakistani general election.

He ran for the seat of the Provincial Assembly of the Punjab from Constituency PP-108 (Sialkot) as a candidate of Pakistan Muslim League (Chatha) in 1997 Pakistani general election but was unsuccessful. He received 11,476 votes and lost the seat to Shahid Mehmood Butt, a candidate of Pakistan Muslim League (N) (PML-N).

In the 2002 election, he was re-elected to the Provincial Assembly of the Punjab as a candidate of PML-Q from Constituency PP-127 (Sialkot-VIII). He received 30,624 votes and defeated Syed Kaleem Abbas, a candidate of Pakistan Peoples Party (PPP). He was inducted into cabinet of Pervez Elahi as Minister of Power on 23 November 2003. He served as Provincial Minister till 2007.

He ran for the seat of the Provincial Assembly of the Punjab as a candidate of PML-Q from Constituency PP-127 (Sialkot-VIII) in 2008 Pakistani general election but was unsuccessful. He received 26,412 votes and lost the seat to Munawar Ahmed Gill.

He was elected to the National Assembly as a candidate of PML-N from Constituency NA-111 (Sialkot-II) in 2013 Pakistani general election. He received 137,474 votes and defeated Firdous Ashiq Awan. In October 2017, he was appointed Federal Parliamentary Secretary for climate change.

He was re-elected to the National Assembly as a candidate of PML-N from Constituency NA-72 (Sialkot-I) in 2018 Pakistani general election. He received 129,041 votes and defeated Firdous Ashiq Awan.

References

Living people
Pakistan Muslim League (N) MNAs
Punjabi people
Pakistani MNAs 2013–2018
Politicians from Sialkot
1966 births
Punjab MPAs 1993–1996
Punjab MPAs 2002–2007
Pakistani MNAs 2018–2023
University of the Punjab alumni